The canton of Naves is an administrative division of the Corrèze department, south-central France. It was created at the French canton reorganisation which came into effect in March 2015. Its seat is in Naves.

It consists of the following communes:
 
Les Angles-sur-Corrèze
Bar
Chameyrat
Corrèze
Favars
Gimel-les-Cascades
Meyrignac-l'Église
Naves
Orliac-de-Bar
Saint-Augustin
Saint-Germain-les-Vergnes
Saint-Hilaire-Peyroux
Saint-Mexant

References

Cantons of Corrèze